Kohtumine Albertiga ('Meeting Albert') is a compilation album by Estonian rock musician Urmas Alender, coupled with Armastuse ämblik. It was previously released with Armastuse ämblik on the Kohtumine Albertiga box set.

The album is by tracks 4-15 a re-release of Vana kloun, plus there are songs from some bands, in which Alender has participated, most notably Data, others are Andromeeda, Teravik and Varjud.

Track listing
 "Varjude revolutsioon" (Revolution of shadows) (Urmas Alender/Urmas Alender) - 4:14 (performed by Andromeeda)
 "Sel poisil oli raske" (That boy had it hard) (Urmas Alender/Jüri Üdi) - 3:47 (performed by Varjud)
 "Teravik on suunatud alla" (The [sharp] point was aimed downwards) (Kuusik, Sagadi, Kerstenbeck, Alender/Alender) - 4:57 (performed by Teravik)
 "Vana kloun" (Old clown) (Urmas Alender/Urmas Alender) - 3:57
 "Kadunud poeg" (Lost son) (Urmas Alender/A. Valgma) - 4:15
 "Korralik pere" (A decent family) (Urmas Alender/Jüri Üdi) - 3:45
 "Laul sügavast düünist" (Song about a deep dune) (Urmas Alender/Jüri Üdi) - 3:10
 "Oma saar" (Own island) (Urmas Alender/Gustav Suits) - 2:25
 "Võta mind lehtede varju!" (Take me under the cover of leaves!) (Urmas Alender/Viivi Luik) - 2:20
 "Suur rõõm ja väike mure" (Big joy and a small concern) (Urmas Alender/Ott Arder) - 2:13
 "Meelelahutus" (Entertainment) (Urmas Alender/Ott Arder) - 2:01
 "Juuspeened keeled" (Hair thin strings) (Urmas Alender/Ott Arder) - 3:37
 "Kohtumine Albertiga" (Meeting Albert) (Urmas Alender/Ott Arder) - 2:19
 "Lauluke" (Ditty) (Urmas Alender/Ott Arder) - 3:06
 "Imelapse lapsepõlv" (The childhood of a wonder kid) (Urmas Alender/Ott Arder) - 2:55
 "Kõik läheb mööda" (All goes by) (Tiit Aunaste/Urmas Alender) - 5:06 (performed by Data)
 "Kui kaua?" (How long?) (Tiit Aunaste/Urmas Alender) - 6:16 (performed by Data)
 "Tuumavaba Eesti" (Nuclear-free Estonia) (Urmas Alender/Urmas Alender) - 3:09 (performed by Data)
 "Taevased ratsamehed" (Heavenly horsemen) (Igor Garšnek/Urmas Alender) - 3:29 (performed by Data)
 "Hoia mind nii" (Hold me like this) (Tiit Aunaste/Urmas Alender) - 5:45 (performed by Data)

Urmas Alender albums
2003 compilation albums
Estonian-language albums